Søren Huss (born 6 September 1975) is a Danish singer, songwriter and musician. Prior to a solo career, he is best known as the lead singer and lyricist of the rock band Saybia, which was formed in Nyborg in January 1993. After a hiatus of 7 years, Saybia announced in June 2015 their new album will come out in October.

On 18 October 2010 Huss released his first solo album Troen & ingen on Universal. The album was well received by the Danish reviewers, and was a commercial success reaching #1 on Hitlisten, the Danish Albums Chart and was awarded platinum.

On 15 October 2012 Huss released his second album Oppefra og ned which charted straight in #1 in the albums chart.

Personal life
Huss was born in Nyborg. He has a daughter called Ronja by his former partner, school teacher Camilla Jørgensen, who died in a traffic accident in Valby on 17 December 2007.

Awards
During the Danish Music Awards in 2011, Huss won "Best male artist" award in 2011 for his work on his 2010 album Troen & ingen

Discography
(For discography of albums and singles with Saybia, refer to the Saybia discography section.)

Albums

Singles

Featured in

References

1975 births
Living people
People from Nyborg
21st-century Danish male  singers